Rose Bay Water Airport (IATA: RSE) is a water airport located in the Sydney suburb of Rose Bay, New South Wales, Australia. It is eight kilometres from the city centre and is one of two water airports in Sydney, the other being Palm Beach Water Airport.

History 
On 4 August 1938, Rose Bay Water Airport was officially opened. However, it already had been established as a flying boat base on a 'temporary basis', and was the starting point for the Sydney to London flights that were operated by Qantas Empire Airways and Imperial Airways in a codeshare agreement. This made it Australia's first international airport. In 1942, due to the outbreak of World War II, commercial flights were suspended. 

Ansett Airways commenced operating services to Lord Howe Island in 1953. After the arrival of passenger jetliners in the 1950s, a gradual demise in flying boats began. In 1955, Qantas discontinued its flying boat service. Ansett continued to operate flying boat services to Lord Howe Island until 1974 when the island's land airport opened.

Facilities 

Sydney By Seaplane has a single small terminal to serve customers. Sydney Seaplanes and Seawing Airways are based in another building at Rose Bay.

Airlines and destinations 

Sydney by Seaplane and Seawing Airways, which are both trading names of Krug Agencies Pty Ltd, operate return sight-seeing flights to Palm beach and elsewhere. Sydney Seaplanes offers a series of tour packages, as well as scenic flights.

References

Airports established in 1938
Rose Bay, New South Wales
Seaplane bases
Sydney Harbour
Transport in Sydney
Water aerodromes
1938 establishments in Australia